Stephen Alter (born 1956) is an author of non-fiction and fiction, who was born and raised in India, where he grew up as the son of American missionaries. He lives in Littleton, Colorado, United States and Landour, Uttarakhand, India.

He graduated from Woodstock School (where his father, Robert Alter, served as Principal from 1968 to 1978) in Landour and subsequently from Wesleyan University. 

He has taught writing at the Massachusetts Institute of Technology and at the American University in Cairo. He has been awarded Fulbright Program and Guggenheim Fellowship grants and received an honorary degree from Wesleyan University.  He is the founding director of the Mussoorie Mountain Festival. His memoir Becoming a Mountain: Himalayan Journeys in Search of the Sacred and the Sublime received the 2015 Kekoo Naoroji Award for Himalayan Literature.  His novel about Jim Corbett In the Jungles of the Night was shortlisted for the 2017 DSC Prize for South Asian Literature. His most recent non-fiction book, ''Wild Himalaya: A Natural History of the Greatest Mountain Range on Earth' won the Banff Book Award in the Natural History and Environment category.  It also won the Kekoo Naoroji Award and was shortlisted for the Kamaladevi Chatopadhyay NIF Book Prize.

Selected titles 
Non-Fiction
 All the Way to Heaven: An American Boyhood in the Himalayas (1998)
 Amritsar to Lahore: A Journey Across the India-Pakistan Border (2000)
 Sacred Waters: A Pilgrimage Up the Ganges River to the Source of Hindu Culture (2001)
 Elephas Maximus: A Portrait of the Indian Elephant (2004)
Fantasies of a Bollywood Love Thief (2007)
Becoming a Mountain: Himalayan Journeys in Search of the Sacred and the Sublime (2014)
Wild Himalaya: A Natural History of the Greatest Mountain Range on Earth (2019)

Fiction
 Neglected Lives (1979)
 Silk and Steel (1980)
 The Godchild (1988)
 Renuka (1990)
 Aripan & Other Stories (2005)
 The Rataban Betrayal (2013)
 In the Jungles of the Night: A Novel about Jim Corbett (2016)
 The Dalliance of Leopards (2017)
 Feral Dreams: Mowgli and His Mothers (2020)

For Young Readers
 The Phantom Isles (2007)
 Ghost Letters (2008)
 The Secret Sanctuary (2015)
 The Cloudfarers (2018)

Editor
 The Penguin Book of Modern Indian Short Stories (2001)

References

1956 births
American novelists of Indian descent
Wesleyan University alumni
Living people
MIT School of Humanities, Arts, and Social Sciences faculty
Academic staff of The American University in Cairo
Indian emigrants to the United States
Writers from Dehradun
Fulbright alumni